Ros Evans (née Coats, born 17 January 1950) is a British athlete who competed in fell running, orienteering, ski-orienteering and cross-country skiing. She is also mother to British track cyclist, Neah Evans.

Life
Evans was born at Langbank, Renfrewshire. Her first outdoor pursuits were mountaineering and rock climbing. In order to improve her fitness for these activities, she began running in 1976 while at Jordanhill College where she underwent teacher training. She also began orienteering at around the same time.

As a runner, Evans won the British Fell Running Championships in 1979 and 1981, and in 1979, she set a ladies’ record for the Bob Graham Round with a time of 20:31. She has won the Ben Nevis Race seven times, more than any other woman. Among her other fell race victories were Ben Lomond, the Langdale Horseshoe, Sedbergh Hills, Borrowdale, the Fairfield Horseshoe, the Kentmere Horseshoe, Pendle, and the Snowdon Race. She still holds the female record for the Cow Hill Race from Fort William.

Evans was a Scottish Orienteering Champion and represented Great Britain in the World Orienteering Championships in 1985. She was a winner of the navigational Lake District Mountain Trial and, together with Anne-Marie Grindley, was in the first female team to complete the elite course of the Karrimor International Mountain Marathon.

Evans competed in the World Ski Orienteering Championships and was selected to represent Great Britain in cross-country skiing at the 1984 Winter Olympics where she participated in the 5 km, 10 km, 20 km and 4 x 5 km relay events.

Private life
Evans lives in Aberdeenshire with her husband. Her daughter who lives locally is Neah Evans who is a track cyclist and Olympian.

References

External links
 Original Mountain Marathon on YouTube: 1985 KIMM showing Ros Evans

British female long-distance runners
British fell runners
Olympic cross-country skiers of Great Britain
Cross-country skiers at the 1984 Winter Olympics
British orienteers
Scottish orienteers
Female orienteers
Foot orienteers
Ski-orienteers
Living people
1950 births